Springvale Airport may refer to:

 Springvale Airport (Queensland), near Springvale, Queensland, Australia
 Springvale Airport (Western Australia), near Springvale, Western Australia, Australia
 Springvale Aerodrome, Ontario, Canada

See also
 Springvale (disambiguation)